Aurélien Tertereau (born 24 July 1991) is a French professional footballer who plays as midfielder.

Career
Tertereau is a youth product of Le Mans FC having joined their youth academy at the age of 10.

On 20 June 2018, Tertereau signed with Rodez AF after years in the lower leagues of France. He made his professional debut with Rodez in a 2–0 Ligue 2 win over AJ Auxerre on 26 July 2019.

References

External links
 
 
 

1991 births
Living people
Footballers from Le Mans
French footballers
Association football midfielders
Rodez AF players
Entente SSG players
Le Mans FC players
Ligue 2 players
Championnat National players
Championnat National 2 players
Championnat National 3 players